Haywood v. National Basketball Association, 401 U.S. 1204 (1971), was a U.S. Supreme Court decision that ruled against the NBA's requirement that a player could not be drafted by an NBA team until four years after graduating from high school. Justice Douglas, in an in-chambers opinion, allowed Spencer Haywood to play in the NBA temporarily until the litigation could proceed further. The case was settled out of court, Haywood continued playing, and the NBA modified its four-year rule to allow players to enter the league early in cases of "hardship".

Background
Spencer Haywood turned pro after his sophomore season at the University of Detroit, joining the American Basketball Association’s (ABA) Denver Rockets in 1969. While both the NBA and the ABA required players to be at least four years removed from their high school graduation, the ABA offered a hardship exemption. With his mother raising 10 children while picking cotton at $2 per day (equivalent to about $ per day in ), Haywood met the criteria. 

Haywood led the ABA in scoring (30.0 per game) and rebounding (19.5 per game) in 1969-70, before jumping to the NBA the following season. Seattle SuperSonics owner Sam Schulman signed Haywood to a six-year, $1.5 million contract, ignoring the four-year rule. As a result, the NBA threatened to disallow the contract and implement various sanctions against the SuperSonics.

Procedural history
Haywood challenged this decision by commencing an antitrust action against the NBA. As part of his claim against the NBA, Haywood argued that the conduct of the NBA was a "group boycott" and a violation of the Sherman Antitrust Act. The central issue that had to be determined was whether the NBA draft policy was a restraint on trade and therefore was illegal in accordance with the Sherman Act.

The case was filed in the United States District Court for the Central District of California, which issued an injunction in Haywood's favor, ruling:

The NBA appealed to the Ninth Circuit Court of Appeals, which stayed the injunction. Joined by the SuperSonics, Haywood appealed to the Supreme Court, which upheld the District Court, reinstated that court's injunction against the NBA, and remanded the case to the District Court for further proceedings.

Impact
Shortly after the Supreme Court's decision, the league and Haywood reached an out-of-court settlement which allowed him to stay with the Sonics permanently.

The decision allowed a significant number of high school graduates and college attendees to make themselves eligible for the NBA draft without waiting until four years after high school.

See also
List of United States Supreme Court cases, volume 401
Toolson v. New York Yankees, 
Silver v. New York Stock Exchange, 
Robertson v. National Basketball Association 556 F.2d 682 (2nd Cir. 1977)
Clarett v. National Football League, 369 F.3d 124 (2d Cir. 2004)

References

Further reading

External links
 

United States Supreme Court cases
United States Supreme Court cases of the Burger Court
United States antitrust case law
Sports case law
American Basketball Association
National Basketball Association draft
1971 in United States case law
National Basketball Association controversies